Wallace C. Clifton (1871-1931) was a screenwriter in the United States. His wife Emma Bell Clifton was also a screenwriter.

Filmography
The Girl and the Gambler (1913 film) (1913)
To Be Called For (1914)
The Foreman of Bar Z Ranch (1915)
Hearts of the Jungle (1915)	
Heart's Desire
Just Like a Woman (1915)
Missing Ruby (1915)
Aunt Mary
Heart of the Jungle (1915)
Primitive Way (1915)
Between Matinee and Night (1915)
The Black Butterfly (1916)
Bridges Burned (1917)
Love in a Hurry (1919)	
The Oakdale Affair (1919), film adaptation
Three Green Eyes (1919), film adaptation
Wanted at Headquarters (1920)
Cheated Hearts, Script, (1921)
Colorado, Script, (1921)
False Kisses, Script, (1921)
The Wise Kid, Screenplay, (1922)
The Guttersnipe (1922)
That Woman (1922)
The Barefoot Boy (1923) (original story)

References

Silent film people
American male screenwriters
1871 births
1931 deaths
20th-century American male writers
20th-century American screenwriters